Bangladesh Press Council is an quasi-judicial institution that protects freedom of speech and regulates the press in Bangladesh and is located in Dhaka, Bangladesh.

History
The act to establish the institution was passed in 1974. The institution was established on 18 August 1979. In 2016 the Bangladesh Law commission recommended that the council be given the power to close any newspaper temporarily.

References

1979 establishments in Bangladesh
Quasi-judicial bodies
Organisations based in Dhaka
Government agencies of Bangladesh
Mass media complaints authorities
Regulation in Bangladesh